Mariem Ben Sassi (born 1 April 1991) is a Tunisian footballer, who plays as a goalkeeper for Çaykur Rizespor in the Turkish Women's Super League and the Tunisia women's national team.

Club career
Ben Sassi has played for AS Banque de l'Habitat in Tunisia.

Ben Sassi moved to Turkey to and joined the newly founded team >Çaykur Rizespor to play  in the 2021-22 Turkcell Women's Super League.

International career
Ben Sassi has capped for Tunisia at senior level, including in a 2–0 friendly away win over Jordan on 13 June 2021.

See also
List of Tunisia women's international footballers

References

External links

1991 births
Living people
Tunisian women's footballers
Women's association football goalkeepers
Çaykur Rizespor (women's football) players
Turkish Women's Football Super League players
Tunisia women's international footballers
Tunisian expatriate footballers
Tunisian expatriate sportspeople in Turkey
Expatriate women's footballers in Turkey
20th-century Tunisian women
21st-century Tunisian women
Saudi Women's Premier League players